Anna-Kari Lindholm Berglund (born 3 November 1976 in Sveg, Sweden) is a Swedish female curler. 

Teams

References

External links
 
 

Living people
1976 births
People from Härjedalen
Swedish female curlers